Core is a science fiction novel by author Paul Preuss. First published in August 1993, it is about a group of scientists who must undertake a dangerous trip to the core of the Earth.

Synopsis
After several disasters around the world connected with the electromagnetic field, a group of scientists travel into the Earth's core to start it again.

References

1993 novels
1993 science fiction novels